Lord Dunmore's War, also known as Dunmore's War, was a 1774 conflict between the British colony of Virginia and the Shawnee and Mingo. The governor of Virginia during the conflict was John Murray, 4th Earl of Dunmore, who asked the House of Burgesses to declare a state of war with the Mingo and Shawnee and call out the Virginia militia.

The conflict resulted from escalating violence between white settlers, who, in accordance with previous treaties, were exploring and moving into land south of the Ohio River (modern West Virginia, southwestern Pennsylvania, and Kentucky), and Native Americans, who had rights to hunt there.  Resulting attacks by Indian war bands caused war to be declared "to pacify the hostile Indian war bands".  The war ended soon after Virginia's victory in the Battle of Point Pleasant on October 10, 1774. As a result of this victory, the Colony of Virginia took away the Indian’s right to hunt in the area and agreed to recognize the Ohio River, running nearly north–south at its eastern end, as the boundary between Indian lands, specifically Ohio (west), and the Thirteen Colonies, specifically Virginia and Pennsylvania (east).

Although the Indian national chieftains signed the Treaty of Camp Charlotte, conflict within the Indian nations soon broke out. Some tribesmen felt the treaty sold out their claims and opposed it, and others believed that another war would mean only further losses of territory to the settlers. When war broke out between the American settlers and the British in 1776, the war parties of the Indian nations quickly gained power. They mobilized the various Indian nations to ally with the British and attack the settlers during the Revolutionary War.

Background

Settlement and resistance in the Ohio Country
The area south of the Ohio River had long been claimed by the Iroquois Confederacy. Although they were the most powerful Indian nation in the Northern Colonies, other tribes also made claims to the area and often hunted the region. Contention over the Ohio Country was one of the causes of the Seven Years' War between France and Britain, which ended with France ceding notional control over the entire area at the Treaty of Paris in 1763.

When, in accordance with the Treaty of Fort Stanwix (1768), British officials acquired the land south of the Ohio River from the Iroquois, many other Ohio Indians who had hunted in these lands refused to accede to the treaty and prepared to defend their hunting rights.

At the forefront of this resistance were the Shawnee. They were the most powerful among the anti-Iroquois Indian nations. They soon organized a large confederacy of Shawnee-Ohio Confederated Indians who were opposed to the British and the Iroquois in order to enforce their claims. British officials worked to isolate the Shawnee diplomatically from other Indian nations. When full-blown hostilities broke out within a few years, the Shawnee would find that they faced the Virginia militia with few allies.

Following the 1768 treaty, colonial explorers, surveyors, and settlers began pouring into the region (see Vandalia (colony)). This immediately brought them into direct contact with Native Americans. Of the upper Ohio Valley, especially the Allegheny River, George Washington wrote in his journal for Saturday, Nov. 17, 1770, "The Indians who are very dexterous, even their women, in the Management of Canoes, have there Hunting Camps & Cabins all along the River for the convenience of Transporting their Skins by Water to Market."

In September 1773, a then obscure hunter named Daniel Boone led a group of about 50 emigrants in the first attempt by white colonists to establish a settlement in Kentucky County, Virginia.
On October 9, 1773, Boone's oldest son James, age 16, and a small group of men and boys who were retrieving supplies were attacked by a band of Delawares, Shawnees, and Cherokees. They had decided "to send a message of their opposition to settlement…" James Boone and Henry Russell, a teenage son of future Revolutionary War officer William Russell, were captured and tortured to death. The brutality of the killings shocked the settlers along the frontier, and Boone's party abandoned their expedition. By December, the incident had been reported in Baltimore and Philadelphia newspapers.

The deaths among Boone's party were among the first events in Lord Dunmore's War. For the next several years, Indian nations opposed to the treaty continued to attack settlers, ritually mutilated and tortured to death the surviving men, and took the women and children into slavery.

Early the next year, a field surveyor named William Preston sent a letter of report to the head engineer of the frontier fort construction, namely George Washington, which indicates his understanding of circumstances just prior to the outbreak of Dunmore's War:

FINCASTLE May 27. 1774.DEAR SIRAgreeable to my Promise I directed Mr. Floyd an Assistant to Survey your Land on Cole River on his Way to the Ohio, which he did and in a few Days afterwards sent me the Plot by Mr. Thomas Hog. Mr. Spotswood Dandridge who left the Surveyors on the Ohio after Hog Parted with them, wrote me that Mr. Hog and two other Men with him had never since been heard of. I have had no Opportunity of writing to Mr. Floyd Since. Tho' I suppose he will send me the Courses by the first Person that comes up, if so I shall make out the Certificate and send it down. This I directed him to do when we parted to prevent Accidents. But I am really afraid the Indians will hinder them from doing any Business of Vallue this Season as the Company being only 33 and dayly decreasing were under the greatest Apprehension of Danger when Mr. Dandridge parted with them.

It has been long disputed by our Hunters whether Louisa or Cumberland Rivers was the Boundary between us and the Cherokees. I have taken the Liberty to inclose to you a Report made by some Scouts who were out by my Order; and which Sets that matter beyond a Doubt.

It is say'd the Cherrokees claim the Land to the Westward of the Louisa & between Cumberland M [mutilated] and the ohio. If so, and our Government gives it up we loose all the most Valluable part of that Country. The Northern Indians Sold that Land to the English at the Treaty of Lancaster in 1744, by the Treaty of Logs Town in 1752 and by that at Fort Stanwix in 1768. At that Time the Cherrokees laid no Claim to that Land & how the[y] come to do it now I cannot imagine..., Edited by Stanislaus Murray Hamilton (The Washington Papers, Library of Congress).

"Cresap's War"

Among the settlers was Captain Michael Cresap, the owner of a trading post at Redstone Old Fort (now Brownsville, Pennsylvania) on the Monongahela River. Under authority of the colonial government of Virginia, Cresap had taken control of extensive tracts of land at and below the mouth of Middle Island Creek (now St. Marys, West Virginia.)  He went there in the early spring of 1774 with a party of men to settle his holdings.

Ebenezer Zane, afterwards a famed "Indian fighter" and guide, was engaged at the same time and in the same way with a small party of men on lands which he had taken up at or near the mouth of Sandy Creek (now Ravenswood, West Virginia).

A third and larger group that included George Rogers Clark, who later became a general during the Revolutionary War, had gathered at the mouth of the Little Kanawha River (now Parkersburg, West Virginia.)  They were waiting there for the arrival of other Virginians expected to join them before they moved downriver to settle lands in Kentucky. Clark's group began to hear reports that hostile Indian nationals were robbing and occasionally killing traders, surveyors and others traveling down the Ohio. They concluded that hostile nations of the Shawnee-centered Ohio confederacy were bent on all-out war. The group decided to attack the Ohio Indian village called Horsehead Bottom, near the mouth of the Scioto River (now Portsmouth, Ohio) and on the route to their intended destination in Kentucky.

Few in the group had experience in warfare. After some discussion, the group selected Cresap, whom they knew was about fifteen miles (24 km) upriver. They knew he was intending to follow them into Kentucky, and he had combat experience. They sent for Cresap, who quickly came to meet with the group. After some discussion, Cresap dissuaded them from attacking the Shawnee. He thought that while the actions of the Shawnee-Ohio confederates were hostile, he did not believe war was inevitable. He argued further that if the group carried out its plans, he did not doubt their initial success, but war would then surely come. They would be blamed for it.

He suggested the group return upstream to Zane's small settlement at "Zanesburg" (the future Wheeling) for a few weeks to see what would develop. If the situation calmed, they could resume their journey to Kentucky. The group agreed. When they arrived, however, they found the whole area in an uproar. People were panicked by the stories of the survivors of the Indian attacks. They were upset by the Indian brutality towards captured settlers. Fearing for the lives of women and children, colonists living on the frontier flocked to the town for protection. Cresap's group was swelled with volunteers spoiling for a fight.

Word of the group's arrival and plans had now reached Fort Pitt and Capt. John Connolly, the garrison commander, sent a message asking that the volunteers remain in Zanesburg a few days. He had sent messages to the local tribes to determine their intentions. A flurry of correspondence resulted, first, with the group saying they would wait for further word from Connolly. Before their message reached Fort Pitt, Cresap received a second message from Connolly that said the Shawnee-Ohio tribes had signaled they intended war.

Cresap called a council on April 26. After he read Connolly's letter aloud, the assembly declared war against the Indians. After spotting some Indian canoes on the river the next day, settlers chased them fifteen miles (24 km) downriver to Pipe Creek. There settlers engaged them in battle, with a few casualties on each side. The following day, Clark's party abandoned the original idea of proceeding to Kentucky. Expecting retaliation, they broke camp and moved with Cresap's men to his headquarters at Redstone Old Fort.

The Yellow Creek massacre

Immediately after the Pipe Creek attack, settlers killed relatives of the Mingo leader Logan. Up until this point, Logan had expressed peaceful intentions toward the settlers. He and his hunting party were camped on the west bank of the Ohio at Yellow Creek, about 30 miles above Zanesburg (near present day Steubenville, Ohio) and across the river from Baker's Bottom. On April 30 some members of the hunting party (Logan was not among them) crossed the river to the cabin of Joshua Baker, a settler and rum trader. The visiting Mingo included Logan's younger brother, commonly known as John Petty, and two closely related women. The younger woman was pregnant and also had an infant girl with her. The father of both these children was John Gibson, a well-known trader. Once the group was inside Baker's cabin, some 30 frontiersmen, led by Daniel Greathouse, suddenly crowded in and killed all the visitors except the infant.

When Logan heard of the massacre, he was led to believe that Cresap, not Greathouse, was the man responsible for attack. However, many people familiar with the incident (including Clark) knew that Greathouse and his men were the ones who had killed the party. Settlers along the frontiers realized that these killings were likely to provoke the remaining Indian nations of the Ohio Country to attack. Settlers remaining on the frontier immediately sought safety, either in blockhouses or by fleeing eastward across the Monongahela River. Many even traveled back across the Allegheny Mountains. Their fear was well founded. Logan and small parties of Shawnee and Mingo soon began striking at frontier settlers in revenge for the murders at Yellow Creek.

Dunmore's expedition

Mobilization and movements
Early in May 1774, Dunmore received word that fighting had begun at Yellow Creek and other points on the Ohio. He requested the legislature to authorize general militia forces and fund a volunteer expedition into the Ohio River valley. According to historians Eric Hinderaker and Peter C. Mancall in At the Edge of Empire (2003):
With the new forces, Dunmore advanced toward the Ohio where he split his force into two groups: one would move down the Ohio from Fort Pitt (now Pittsburgh), 1,700 men led by him, and another body of 800 troops under Colonel Andrew Lewis would travel from Camp Union (now Lewisburg, West Virginia) with the two forces rendezvousing at the mouth of the Great Kanawha River. Under this general plan, Dunmore traveled to Fort Pitt and duly proceeded with his forces down the Ohio. On September 30, he arrived at Fort Fincastle (later Fort Henry), recently built at Zanesburg at his direction.

The force under Lewis, now 1,100 strong, proceeded from Camp Union to the headwaters of the Kanawha. From there, he continued downriver to the appointed rendezvous, reaching the river's mouth (October 6) where he established "Camp Pleasant" (soon to be known as Point Pleasant). Not finding Dunmore there, he sent messengers up the Ohio to meet him and tell him of the arrival. On October 9 Dunmore sent a dispatch announcing his Milk to proceed to the Shawnee towns on the Scioto. He ordered Lewis to cross the Ohio and meet him at the Shawnee towns.

Battle of Point Pleasant

On October 10, before Lewis began crossing the Ohio, he and his force were surprised by warriors under Chief Cornstalk. The Battle of Point Pleasant raged nearly all day and descended into hand-to-hand combat. Lewis's army suffered about 215 casualties, of whom 75 were killed, including Lewis's brother, and 140 wounded. His forces defeated the Ohio Confederacy warriors, who retreated across the Ohio, having lost about 40 warriors. Captain George Mathews of the Virginia militia was credited with a flanking maneuver that initiated Cornstalk's retreat.

Treaty of Camp Charlotte
Dunmore and Lewis advanced from their respective points into Ohio to within eight miles (13 km) of the Shawnee towns at Pickaway Plains (present Pickaway County, Ohio) on the Scioto. Here they erected the temporary Camp Charlotte on Scippo Creek and met with Cornstalk to begin peace negotiations. By the terms of the Treaty of Camp Charlotte (19 October 1774), the Shawnee agreed to cease hunting south of the Ohio and to discontinue harassment of travellers on the River. Although Chief Logan said he would cease fighting, he would not attend the formal peace talks. It was here that an agent of Chief Logan (possibly Simon Girty) recited a speech by Logan which became one of the most famous speeches in Indian and Ohio history, dubbed, Logan's Lament.

After the Mingo refused to accept the terms, Major William Crawford attacked their village of Seekunk (Salt Lick Town, now Columbus, Ohio). His force of 240 men destroyed the village. These operations, and the submission of the Shawnee at Camp Charlotte, virtually closed the war.

The treaty was reaffirmed in talks the following year at Fort Pitt, where commissioners from Continental Congress urged representatives from the Iroquois, Shawnee, Lenape, Wyandot, and Odawa to remain neutral in the growing conflict with Great Britain.  In response, Guyasuta urged Pennsylvania and Virginia to resolve their differences.

Fort Gower Resolves

In early November, 1774, the army of Virginians arrived back at the point of land formed by confluence of the Ohio and Hocking Rivers and to the makeshift base camp they had established several weeks earlier named Fort Gower (so named for Earl Gower, a British Lord).  There they were informed that the Continental Congress in Philadelphia had enacted a boycott of English goods in response to the Coercive Acts.  Recognizing the significance of what was essentially an act of rebellion, the Virginians, in a declaration of the increasing spirit of independence among the colonists, addressing King George and their fellow Virginians,  wrote and had published what came to be known as the "Fort Gower Resolves". Among the soldiers present were many Virginians that later became famous in the revolution: William Campbell, George Rogers Clark, William Crawford, Simon Kenton, Andrew Lewis, Daniel Morgan, William Russell, Adam Stephen and many others.

At a Meeting of the Officers under the Command of his Excellency the Right Honourable the EARL of DUNMORE, convened at Fort Gower*, November 5, 1774, for the Purpose of considering the Grievances of BRITISH AMERICA, an Officer present addressed the Meeting in the following Words:

GENTLEMEN: Having now concluded the Campaign, by the Assistance of Providence, with Honour and Advantage to the Colony, and ourselves, it only remains that we should give our Country the strongest Assurance that we are ready, at all Times, to the utmost of our Power, to maintain and defend her just Rights and Privileges. We have lived about three Months in the Woods, without any intelligence from Boston, or from the Delegates at Philadelphia. It is possible, from the groundless Reports of designing Men, that our Countrymen may be jealous of the Use such a Body would make of Arms in their Hands at this critical Juncture. That we are a respectable Body is certain, when it is considered that we can live Weeks without Bread or Salt, that we can sleep in the open Air without any Covering but that of the Canopy of Heaven, and that our Men can march and shoot with any in the known World. Blessed with these Talents, let us solemnly engage to one another, and our Country in particular, that we will use them to no Purpose but for the Honour and Advantage of America in general, and of Virginia in particular. It behooves us then, for the Satisfaction of our Country, that we should give them our real Sentiments, by Way of Resolves, at this very alarming Crisis.

"Whereupon the Meeting made Choice of a  Committee to draw up and prepare Resolves for their Consideration, who immediately withdrew; and after some Time spent therein, reported, that they had agreed to, and prepared the following Resolves, which were read, maturely considered, and agreed to nemine contradicente, by the Meeting, and ordered to be published in the Virginia Gazette:

Resolved, that we will bear the most faithful Allegiance to his Majesty King George III, whilst his Majesty delights to reign over a brave and free People; that we will, at the Expense of Life, and every Thing dear and valuable, exert ourselves in Support of the Honour of his Crown and the Dignity of the British empire. But as the Love of Liberty, and Attachment to the real Interests and just Rights of America outweigh every other Consideration, we resolve that we will exert every Power within us for the Defence of American Liberty, and for the Support of her just Rights and Privileges; not in any precipitate, riotous, or tumultous Manner, but when regularly called forth by the unanimous Voice of our Countrymen.

Resolved, that we entertain the greatest Respect for his Excellency the Right Honourable Lord Dunmore, who commanded the Expedition against the Shawanese; and who, we are confident, underwent the great Fatigue of this singular Campaign from no other Motive than the true Interest of this Country.

Signed by Order, and in Behalf of the whole corps,

,

Clerk.
The Resolves were published in the Virginia Gazette Dec. 22, 1774.

It was the first time colonists had asserted that they were prepared to use force of arms against the Crown to secure their rights - acts which, if executed, would be treason.

These resolves were virtually a declaration of independence in Ohio by Virginia backwoodsmen six months before the shot in Concord 'heard round the world' and fully a year and a half before the peal of the Liberty Bell announced the freedom of the colonies.

Aftermath
Dunmore's militia then retreated over the Alleghenies proceeding by Redstone Old Fort and the Great Crossings of the Youghiogheny River to Fort Cumberland, and then to Williamsburg. the at the time Virginia's capital. The peace did not prevail for long following this treaty, however. On March 24, 1775, a band of Shawnee who apparently did not recognize the Ohio river boundary attacked Daniel Boone in Kentucky along the Wilderness Road. And in May 1776, as the American Revolution got underway, the Shawnee joined renegade Cherokee chief Dragging Canoe in again declaring war on the Virginia colonists. These were the Cherokee–American wars of 1776-1794.

Notes

References
 Butterfield, Consul Willshire. An Historical Account of the Expedition against Sandusky under Col. William Crawford in 1782. Cincinnati: Clarke, 1873.
 Crumrine, Boyd. History of Washington County, Pennsylvania With Biographical Sketches of Many of Its Pioneers and Prominent Men. Philadelphia: L. H. Everts & Co., 1882.
 Dowd, Gregory Evans. A Spirited Resistance: The North American Indian Struggle for Unity, 1745–1815. Baltimore: Johns Hopkins University Press, 1992. .
 Downes, Randolph C. Council Fires on the Upper Ohio: A Narrative of Indian Affairs in the Upper Ohio Valley until 1795. Pittsburgh: University of Pittsburgh Press, 1940.  (1989 reprint).
 Faragher, John Mack. Daniel Boone: The Life and Legend of an American Pioneer. New York: Holt, 1992; .
 Hintzen, William. The Border Wars of the Upper Ohio Valley (1769–1794). Manchester, CT: Precision Shooting Inc., 2001. 
 Lewis, Virgil A. History of the Battle of Point Pleasant. Charleston, West Virginia: Tribune, 1909. Reprinted Maryland: Willow Bend, 2000. .
 Lofaro, Michael. Daniel Boone: An American Life. Lexington, KY: University Press of Kentucky, 2003; . Previously published (in 1978 and 1986) as The Life and Adventures of Daniel Boone.
 Miller, Sarah E. "William Crawford". The Encyclopedia of the American Revolutionary War: A Political, Social, and Military History. 1:311–13. Gregory Fremont-Barnes and Richard Alan Ryerson, eds. Santa Barbara, California: ABC-CLIO, 2006. .
 O'Donnell, James H., III. "William Crawford". American National Biography. 5:710–11. Ed. John A. Garraty and Mark C. Carnes. New York: Oxford University Press, 1999. .
 Randall, Emilius Oviatt and Daniel Joseph Ryan. History of Ohio: the rise and progress of an American state, Volume 2. The Century History Company, 1912. (public domain, downloadable)
 Randall, E. O. The Dunmore War. Columbus, Ohio: Heer, 1902.
 

 Smith, Thomas H., ed. Ohio in the American Revolution: A Conference to Commemorate the 200th Anniversary of the Ft. Gower Resolves. Columbus: Ohio Historical Society, 1976.
 Sugden, John. Blue Jacket: Warrior of the Shawnees. Lincoln and London: University of Nebraska Press, 2000. .
 Thwaites, Reuben Gold and Louise Phelps Kellogg, eds. Documentary History of Dunmore's War, 1774. Madison: Wisconsin Historical Society, 1905. Reprinted Baltimore: Clearfield, 2002. .
 Williams, Glenn F. Dunmore's War: The Last Conflict of America's Colonial Era. 2017.

1774 in the Thirteen Colonies
Conflicts in 1773
Conflicts in 1774
Military history of the Thirteen Colonies
Colonial American and Indian wars
Shawnee history
History of the Midwestern United States
1774 in Virginia